The 96th Air Division is an inactive United States Air Force unit. Its last assignment was with the Tenth Air Force at Scott Air Force Base, Illinois. It was inactivated on 27 June 1949.

As the 96th Bombardment Wing, the unit was one of the primary Consolidated B-24 Liberator heavy strategic bombardment wings of the Eighth Air Force 2d Bombardment Division in World War II.

History
"The 96th Bombardment Wing's units entered combat in early 1944, bombing oil refineries, marshaling yards, steel plants, and tank factories plus numerous other assorted targets in the European theater. In September 1944, some of the units ceased bombardment missions and instead flew gasoline for Army units to airfields in France. Others air-dropped supplies to Allied troops during the airborne attack on the Netherlands that same month. During the Battle of the Bulge, December 1944 through January 1945, subordinate units of the 97th aided Allied ground forces by bombing German transportation lines. Besides strategic bombardment, they also dropped supplies to Allied troops during the airborne assault across the Rhine River in March 1945."

Returned to the United States in summer 1945.  Programmed to become a Boeing B-29 Superfortress command wing, however inactivated at the end of the Pacific War.

"Active in the Reserves from June 1947 to June 1949, the organization was redesignated as a division in April 1948."

Lineage
 Established as the 96th Combat Bombardment Wing (Heavy) on 8 November 1943
 Activated on 11 January 1944
 Redesignated 96th Combat Bombardment Wing, Heavy on 7 August 1944
 Redesignated 96th Bombardment Wing, Heavy on 9 June 1945
 Redesignated 96th Bombardment Wing, Very Heavy on 17 August 1945
 Inactivated on 17 October 1945
 Activated in the Reserve on 12 June 1947
 Redesignated 96th Air Division, Bombardment on 16 April 1948
 Inactivated on 27 June 1949

Assignments
 Eighth Air Force, 11 January 1944
 2d Bombardment Division (later 2d Air Division), 22 February 1944
 VIII Fighter Command, 16 July - 6 August 1945
 Army Service Forces, Port of Embarkation, 6 August - c. 14 August 1945
 Second Air Force, c. 14 August-17 October 1945
 Second Air Force, 2 June 1947
 Tenth Air Force, 1 July 1948 – 27 June 1949

Components

 44th Bombardment Group, 26 June-24 July 1945
 93d Bombardment Group, c. 6 June-24 July 1945
 351st Bombardment Group, 4 June 1948 – 27 June 1949
 381st Bombardment Group, 17 October 1947 – 4 June 1948
 392d Bombardment Group, c. 6 July 1944-c. 7 June 1945
 446th Bombardment Group, 1 June-c. 30 July 1945

 448th Bombardment Group, 6 July 1944 – 23 July 1945
 458th Bombardment Group, c. 8 February 1944 – 25 July 1945
 466th Bombardment Group, c. 14 March 1944-c. 2 October 1945
 467th Bombardment Group, c. 18 March 1944-c. 17 October 1945
 491st Bombardment Group, c. 5 May 1944-c. 16 June 1945

Stations
 RAF Horsham St Faith, England, 11 January 1944
 Ketteringham Hall, England, c. 1 June-c. 5 August 1945
 Sioux Falls Army Air Field, South Dakota, c. 14 August 1945
 Peterson Field, Colorado, 16 August-17 October 1945
 Scott Field (later Scott Air Force Base, Illinois, 12 June 1947 – 27 June 1949

Aircraft
 consolidated B-24 Liberator, 1944–1945
 North American AT-6 Texan, 1948–1949
 Beechcraft AT-11, 1948–1949

See also
 List of United States Air Force air divisions

References

Notes

Bibliography

 

096
Military units and formations in Illinois